Ah Hoon (died 1909) was a Chinese American comedian, actor, and associate of the On Leong Tong.
A celebrated comic in New York's Chinatown during the tong wars between the On Leong and Hip Sing Tong, Ah Hoon began insulting the rival Hip Sings during performances at the Chinese Theater on Doyers Street.

Comedian and Chinese Tong connections
Perceiving his insults as an attack of their honor, the Hip Sings declared a death sentence against Ah Hoon. Publicly announcing his death to take place on December 30, Ah Hoon came under the protection of the On Leongs. On December 29, Ah Hoon was under the protection of a police sergeant and two patrolmen as he performed and was escorted back to his Chatham Square boardinghouse where members of the On Leongs stood on guard.

1909 New York Tong War and death
The On Leong began holding parades celebrating their victory over the Hip Sings. However, the following morning, Ah Hoon's body was found after he had been shot in the head and killed.

Despite Herbert Asbury’s claim in his 1928 book “The Gangs of New York” that a Hip Sing hatchetman had been lowered from the roof while on a chair and sneaked into the apartment where he shot the sleeping comedian with a silenced pistol, the reality is that Ah Hoon’s body was discovered in the hallway, having been killed after his police escorts had already left him alone and he attempted to wash up in the communal basin.

The following day the Hip Sings paraded throughout Chinatown; however, the murder of Ah Hoon remained unsolved by authorities as the war between the On Leongs and Hip Sings continued for another year.

Notable Chinese tongs
Bing Kong Tong
Hip Sing Tong
On Leong Tong
Suey Sing Tong
Hop Sing Tong

See also
Hui
Tong Wars
Triad (underground society)
Tiandihui
List of Chinese criminal organizations
List of criminal enterprises, gangs and syndicates

References
Asbury, Herbert. The Gangs of New York. New York: Alfred A. Knopf, 1927. 
Sifakis, Carl. The Encyclopedia of American Crime. New York: Facts on File Inc., 2005. 
 "New Tong Murder; Chinaman Killed", New York Times, December 30, 1909, p1

Year of birth missing
1909 deaths
American people of Chinese descent
American male comedians
Comedians from New York City
People murdered by Chinese-American organized crime
People murdered in New York City
Male murder victims
Deaths by firearm in Manhattan
American murder victims
Chinese murder victims